Dulepovo is a rural locality (a village) in Mayskoye Rural Settlement, Vologodsky District, Vologda Oblast, Russia. The population was 60 as of 2002. There are 4 streets.

Geography 
Dulepovo is located 21 km northwest of Vologda (the district's administrative centre) by road. Pailovo is the nearest  locality. Creek Mesha      Расстояние от Дулепова до Вологды 12 km

References 

Rural localities in Vologodsky District